Tammy Lauren Vásquez (born November 16, 1968), known professionally as Tammy Lauren, is an American film and television actress. She starred in the 1997 horror film Wishmaster, portraying Alexandra Amberson, a young woman who accidentally awakens a djinn, a powerful spirit more commonly known as a genie.

Biography

Career
As a child actress, Lauren's acting debut was in the role of Melissa Turner on the one-season television series Who's Watching the Kids?, in which she co-starred with Scott Baio, followed by stints on the short-lived sitcoms Out of the Blue and Angie,  the following year. Lauren's guest appearances included television series such as Mork & Mindy, Fantasy Island, The Facts of Life, Family Ties and Little House on the Prairie.

Lauren co-starred with Elliott Gould and a young Rick Schroder in Disney's The Last Flight of Noah's Ark. She had a recurring role on the CBS daytime drama The Young and the Restless, where she portrayed Maggie Sullivan and also co-starred in many other television productions, including the movies Tattle: When To Tell On a Friend, Crime of Innocence and the 1988 remake I Saw What You Did. (The latter two paired her with Shawnee Smith.)

Among television fans, Lauren may be best known from the 1990s for her role as Ginger Szabo on Homefront, a series set in post-World War II Ohio. Lauren has also enjoyed recurring roles on Home Improvement and Wanda at Large (as Wanda's sister in-law). She appeared in the first five episodes of Martial Law with Sammo Hung. She also appeared in two episodes of Walker, Texas Ranger ("99th Ranger" and "A Father's Image") and appeared in an episode of MacGyver ("Nightmares"). She appears in Mad City (1997) with Dustin Hoffman and John Travolta, among several other theatrical releases. Wishmaster (1997) is the only feature film in which Lauren has played a starring role. She appeared on Two and a Half Men as Shannon in the episode "Aunt Myra Doesn't Pee a Lot" (2007). In 2014, she appeared on Criminal Minds as Liz Foley.

Personal life
Lauren was born Tammy Lauren Vásquez in San Diego, California. Her mother is Suzanne Bledsoe, a talent manager and her father is Mexican. Her stepfather was director Charles Jarrott. Lauren is married to actor Guri Weinberg, son of the Israeli wrestling coach Moshe Weinberg, who was killed in the Munich Massacre.

Filmography

Film

Television

Awards and nominations

Notes and references

External links
 
 
 
 

1968 births
Living people
Actresses from San Diego
American child actresses
American film actresses
American television actresses
American actresses of Mexican descent
American people of Mexican descent
20th-century American actresses
21st-century American actresses